Ouara is an ancient city and former capital of the Ouaddai Empire of Chad.

Ouara may also refer to:
 Ouara Department, a modern administrative unit of Chad
 Ouara, Benin, a town and arrondissement in north-eastern Benin
 Ouara language, an alternative name for two related Niger-Congo languages of Burkina Faso:
Samwe language
Paleni language

See also 
 Wara (disambiguation)